Kevin Blumenfeld is an American composer best known for his ongoing work with director Charles Hood.

Early life and career
Blumenfeld was raised in Beverly Hills. After finishing high school, he studied film scoring, orchestration and electronic music at the Hamilton Academy of Music. Blumenfeld gained his first professional music experiences by working for Hans Zimmer as a music intern, taking on minor uncredited roles in the soundtracks of Pearl Harbor, Black Hawk Down, Matchstick Men and The Ring.

Blumenfeld’s first independent composing credit was on director Charles Hood’s debut feature Freezer Burn. Blumenfeld and Hood would form an ongoing relationship, with the former working on every one of the latter’s subsequent projects, including short films, his follow-up feature Night Owls, and his television series for Go90, In the Vault. Blumenfeld also served as composer on the Walking Dead webisodes series Cold Storage, The Oath and Torn Apart. Blumenfeld also worked extensively with director Adam Rifkin, scoring his films Shooting the Warwicks and Director’s Cut.

Filmography

Film

Television

References

External links 

21st-century American composers
Living people
Year of birth missing (living people)